Spagnoli is an Italian surname meaning "Spaniard", "Spanish" or "from Spain". Notable people with the name include:

 Giuseppe Spagnoli (born 1947), Italian wrestler
 Jerry Spagnoli (born 1956), American daguerrotype photographer 
 Luisa Spagnoli (1877-1935), Italian businesswoman
 Pietro Spagnoli (born 1964), Italian operatic baritone

Italian toponymic surnames
Ethnonymic surnames